Live à l'Olympia is the 1996 live album by Cesária Évora.  The live album features tracks that Cesária Évora sung at the legendary Olympia in Paris.

Track listing

References

External links

1996 live albums
Cesária Évora albums